Gu Dasao (literally "Elder Sister-in-Law Gu") is a fictional character in Water Margin, one of the Four Great Classical Novels of Chinese literature. Nicknamed "Female Tiger", she ranks 101st among the 108 Stars of Destiny and 65th among the 72 Earthly Fiends.

Background
The novel depicts Gu Dasao as having thick eyebrows, large eyes, a plump face and a thick waist. Although she likes to wear ornaments on her head and wrists, she did not settle into a housewife role as most women did in her time. Instead she behaves like a man often getting into a fight. Specialised in pole weapons such as spear and staff, she could take on 30 men at the same time. She may even beat up her husband Sun Xin if he offends her.

The couple run a tavern in Dengzhou (登州; in present-day eastern Shandong), where Sun Xin's brother Sun Li is the local garrison commandant.  Because of her quick temper and pugnacious character, Gu Dasao is nicknamed "Female Tiger".

Prison raid in Dengzhou
Gu Dasao is informed by the jailer Yue He of the Dengzhou prison that the hunter brothers Xie Zhen and Xie Bao, who are Gu's cousins, have been jailed and might be murdered. Yue is related to Gu and the Xies as his sister is married to Sun Li, Gu's brother-in-law. The Xies are arrested for smashing up the house of one Squire Mao after they failed to find a tiger they shot that had fallen into the old man's garden. In fact, the squire had sent the tiger to the prefecture office to claim reward. 

Gu Dasao consults with her husband, who invites the outlaws Zou Yuan and Zou Run to help in the rescue. Gu is worried that her brother-in-law Sun Li would stand in their way. So she pretends to be ill and gets Sun Li to visit her. When Sun appears, she threatens him to decide either to join them or fight them. Sun reluctantly signs on to their plan.

Pretending to take food to the Xie brothers, Gu Dasao is let into the prison by Yue He. Yue then frees the Xies, who are locked on a stone bed. Gu assists them to break out of the prison as Sun Li attacks the front gate with the rest. After pulling off the rescue, the group flee to join the outlaws of Liangshan Marsh.

Battle against the Zhu Family Village 
Before going up to the stronghold, Sun Li volunteers to infiltrate the Zhu Family Manor, which Liangshan has failed to take in two offensives. As Sun Li has learnt combat from the same teacher as Luan Tingyu, the martial arts instructor of the manor, he wins the confidence of the Zhus. Gu Dasao, together with her husband, Zou Yuan, Zou Run, the Xie brothers and Yue He, go on a rampage inside the manor, taking it by surprise, when Sun Li gives his signal. The fall of the Zhu Family Manor is a huge contribution by the group before their acceptance into Liangshan.

When Liangshan attacks Dongping prefecture to seize its grain stock, Shi Jin infiltrates the city to stage an internal sabotage. But he is discovered and arrested. Gu Dasao is sent to sneak into the prison to instruct him to break out of jail and unleash havoc within the city when Song Jiang mounts an external attack. Although the plan fails as Shi strikes one day too early, Gu and Shi escape when Dongping falls to the outlaws.

Campaigns and later life
Gu Dasao and her husband are put in charge of an inn which acts as a lookout for Liangshan after the 108 Stars of Destiny came together in what is called the Grand Assembly. Gu participates in the campaigns against the Liao invaders and rebel forces in the Song territory following amnesty from Emperor Huizong for Liangshan.

Gu and her husband survive all the campaigns. Although conferred the title "Lady of Dongyuan County", she returns to Dengzhou with her husband to live as a commoner.

Notes

References
 
 
 
 
 
 
 

72 Earthly Fiends
Fictional women soldiers and warriors
Fictional characters from Shandong